Abraham Guillén (13 March 1913 – 1 August 1993), was a Spanish author, economist and educator. He was a veteran of the Spanish Civil War, influenced by anarchism. One of the most prolific revolutionary writers in Latin America during the 1960s and intellectual mentor of Uruguay's revolutionary Movement of National Liberation (Tupamaros), he is most widely known as the author of Strategy of the Urban Guerrilla, which played an important role in the activities of urban guerrillas in Uruguay, Argentina, and Brazil.

Biography

Guillen was born in Guadalajara on March 13, 1913. During the Spanish Civil War he fought against the Francisco Franco's forces, operating within the National Confederation of Labour (CNT), the Iberian Anarchist Federation (FAI), and the General Union of Workers (UGT). At the end of the war, he was arrested by Franco's forces, condemned to death, and ultimately was sentenced to ten years in prison. He escaped from prison in 1945, fled Spain, and spent three years in France.

In 1948, he emigrated to Argentina. During the Perón era, he worked as an editor for Economia y finanzas ("Economy and Finance"), and his contributions were published under the pseudonym, Jaime de las Heras. Under another pseudonym, that of Fernando Molina, he contributed to the Buenos Aires newspaper El Laborista. His 1957 publication The Agony of Imperialism, resulted in the loss of his job and his barring from employment as a journalist in Argentina. In 1960, he was employed briefly as an economic consultant to the Argentine government.
In 1961, he was imprisoned for a few months on the charge that he was a member of the Uturuncos, guerrillas active in northwest Argentina during 1960 and 1961. Following his imprisonment he sought political asylum in Montevideo in 1962 and soon made contact with revolutionary elements in that country. The first edition of Strategy of the Urban Guerrilla was published in 1966. It served as a counter to the rural insurrectionist methods espoused by Che Guevara, although Guillen did agree with Guevara on several key issues and even authored the introduction to the Uruguayan edition of Guevara's Guerrilla Warfare.

Guillen continued to publish frequently during this time period. He took a position as a journalist for the Montevideo newspaper Accion, often using the pseudonym of Arapey. Throughout the late 1960s and early 1970s, he was a constant subject of investigations both by Latin America police and by the CIA. In addition to Argentina and Uruguay, he also lived and worked in Peru and eventually returned to Madrid, Spain, where he taught theories of economic self-management and communal political action. He died on August 1, 1993.

Works

El imperio del dolar: América Latina: Revolución o alienación, Buenos Aires 1962
Teoria de la violencia; guerra y lucha de clases, Buenos Aires 1965
Estrategia de la guerrilla urbana (Ediciones Liberación, 1969)
Desafío al Pentagono; la guerrilla latinoamericana, Montevideo 1969
Philosophy of the urban guerrilla. The revolutionary writings of Abraham Guillén, New York 1973
El Capitalismo Soviético: Última etapa del Imperialismo (Queimada Ediciones, 1979)
El error militar de las izquierdas, Barcelona 1980
Economía libertaria (Fundación Anselmo Lorenzo, 1988)
Técnica de la desinformación (Fundación Anselmo Lorenzo, 1991)

General sources
 "A Guide to the Abraham Guillen Collection"

1913 births
1993 deaths
Guerrilla warfare theorists
Urban guerrilla warfare theorists
People from Guadalajara, Spain
Spanish rebels
Revolution theorists
Anarchist theorists
Exiles of the Spanish Civil War in Argentina
Exiles of the Spanish Civil War in Uruguay
Spanish anarchists
Argentine anarchists
Uruguayan anarchists